Laurel Township may refer to the following townships in the United States:

 Laurel Township, Franklin County, Indiana
 Laurel Township, Hocking County, Ohio

See also 
 Mount Laurel Township, New Jersey